Panasonic Lumix DMC-FZ200 is a digital camera by Panasonic Lumix, which was announced in July 2012. The highest-resolution pictures it records is 12.1 megapixels, through a 25 mm Leica DC Vario-Elmarit.

Property
F2.8 aperture across entire zoom range
24X power O.I.S. Leica 600 mm
12 fps burst rate
Full 1080/60p HD video

References

External links

DMC-FZ200K on shop.panasonic.com
Panasonic Lumix DMC-FZ200 review

FZ200
Superzoom cameras